The 1989 Bulgarian Supercup was the first Bulgarian Supercup match, a football match which was contested between the "A" professional football group champion, CSKA Sofia, and the runner-up of Bulgarian Cup, Chernomorets Burgas. The match was held on 1 August 1989 at the Chernomorets Stadium in Burgas, Bulgaria. CSKA beat Chernomorets 1–0 after to win their first Bulgarian Supercup.

Match details

References
History Pfl.bg

1989
PFC CSKA Sofia matches
Supercup